Arctostaphylos viscida, with the common names whiteleaf manzanita and sticky manzanita, is a species of manzanita.

Distribution
Arctostaphylos viscida is a plant of chaparral and coniferous forests of some elevation. It is native to California and Oregon.

Description 
The stems may be smooth or fuzzy, and are often glandular. The leaves are rounded to oval, sometimes slightly toothed or with hairs along the edges, and usually dull green on both surfaces.

When in flower the shrub is packed heavily with densely bunching inflorescences of urn-shaped white to pale pink flowers. The fruits are shiny red or greenish-brown drupes between one half and one centimeter wide. Seeds require fire for germination.

Uses
The Miwok of northern California used the fruits to make cider.

References

External links
Jepson Manual Treatment - Arctostaphylos viscida
USDA Plants Profile; Arctostaphylos viscida
Ecology
Ethnobotany
Arctostaphylos viscida - Photo gallery

viscida
Flora of California
Flora of Oregon
Flora of the Klamath Mountains
Flora of the Sierra Nevada (United States)
Natural history of the California chaparral and woodlands
Pre-Columbian California cuisine
Plants used in Native American cuisine
Flora without expected TNC conservation status